In Greek mythology, the Old Man of the Sea was a primordial figure who could be identified as any of several water-gods, generally Nereus or Proteus, but also Triton, Pontus, Phorcys or Glaucus. He is the father of Thetis (the mother of Achilles).

Mythology 
In book 4 of Homer's Odyssey, Menelaus recounts to Telemachus his journey home, and how he had to seek the advice of the Old Man of the Sea. The Old Man can answer any questions if captured, but capturing him means holding on as he changes from one form to another. Menelaus captured him, and during the course of questioning, asked if Telemachus' father Odysseus was still alive.

Sinbad 

Sinbad the Sailor encountered the monstrous Old Man of the Sea on his fifth voyage. The Old Man of the Sea in the Sinbad tales was said to trick a traveller into letting him ride on his shoulders while the traveller transported him across a stream. However, the Old Man would then not release his grip, forcing his victim to transport him wherever he pleased and allowing his victim little rest. The Old Man's victims all eventually died of this miserable treatment, with the Old Man either eating them or else robbing them. Sinbad, however, after getting the Old Man drunk with wine, was able to shake him off and kill him.

References in poetry
The Old Man of the Sea is alluded to in Edwin Arlington Robinson's book-length narrative poem King Jasper. In part 3 of the poem, King Jasper dreams of his deceased friend Hebron (whom Jasper betrayed) riding on his back. "You cannot fall yet, and I'm riding nicely," Hebron tells Jasper. "If only we might have the sight of water, / We'd say that I'm the Old Man of the Sea, / And you Sinbad the Sailor." Hebron then turns to gold (a symbol of Jasper's motivation for betraying him) and coaxes Jasper to leap across a ravine with the heavy, golden Hebron on his back.

The Old Man of the Sea also figures in the poetry of West Indian poet Derek Walcott. In a 1965 paper, "The Figure of Crusoe", writing about the poem "Crusoe's Journal", Walcott notes:

Referencing the figures of Adam, Christofer (Columbus) and Friday in succession, the poem's narrator remarks, "All shapes, all objects multiplied from his,/our ocean's Proteus;/in childhood, his derelict's old age/was like a god's."

References in other works
The Old Man of the Sea is briefly mentioned in Michael Scott's The Sorceress: The Secrets of the Immortal Nicholas Flamel to prevent Perenelle Flamel from escaping Alcatraz.
Going by the name Nereus, this character features in The Titan's Curse, the third novel in the Percy Jackson and the Olympians series, in which Percy wrestles him.  
The Old Man of the Sea is mentioned in The Devil's Code (2000) by John Sandford. It is also mentioned in The Navigator by Morris West.
The Old Man of the Sea is mentioned in The Log from the Sea of Cortez by John Steinbeck.
The Old Man of the Sea is also a card in Magic: The Gathering trading card game in the expansion Arabian Nights based upon the character in Sinbad voyages, with Susan Van Camp's artwork clearly demonstrating a controlling and torturous character.
The Old Man of the Sea is mentioned in Avengers, Vol. 1, No. 1 (1963) by Loki.
The Old Man also appears in the fourth episode of the Japanese anime series Arabian Nights: Sinbad's Adventures. This version is able to speak and execute feats of superhuman strength, and can turn himself into a humanoid goat.
The Old Man of the Sea is mentioned in Little Women (1868-9) by Jo in reference to Aunt March.
The Old Man of the Sea is mentioned in George Moore's short story 'Mildred Lawson' (1895): '[…] she had become a sort of Old Man of the Sea […]' (Celibates, London: Walter Scott, 1895, page 104)
The Old Man of the Sea is mentioned multiple times in Beware of Pity by Stefan Zweig. One instance can be found on page 294.
The Old Man of the Sea is a follower card in the board game Talisman the Magical Adventure, 4th ed. The card curses the player to lose 1 life, 1 craft, or one strength every turn until he is delivered to the Tavern.
The Old Man of the Sea is mentioned in Methuselah's Children by Robert Heinlein.
The Old Man of the Sea is also mentioned in The Golden Key by George MacDonald.

References 

Greek sea gods
One Thousand and One Nights characters
Sea and river gods
Triton (mythology)